Allen Njie (born 26 July 1999) is a Liberian footballer who plays as a midfielder for Swiss club FC Aarau.

Club career
Born in Barnesville, Njie has played for Liberian clubs Pepper FC and LISCR as well as Swiss club Grasshopper.

In October 2020 he moved on loan to Israeli club Bnei Sakhnin.

In February 2021 he moved on loan to Croatian club Slaven Belupo.

In July 2021, he moved to Swiss club FC Aarau.

International career
After playing for the Liberian under-20 team, he made his senior international debut for Liberia in 2018.

References

1999 births
Living people
Liberian footballers
Liberia under-20 international footballers
Liberia international footballers
Association football midfielders
LISCR FC players
Grasshopper Club Zürich players
NK Slaven Belupo players
Bnei Sakhnin F.C. players
FC Aarau players
Swiss Challenge League players
Croatian Football League players
Liberian expatriate footballers
Expatriate footballers in Switzerland
Liberian expatriate sportspeople in Switzerland
Expatriate footballers in Israel
Liberian expatriate sportspeople in Israel
Expatriate footballers in Croatia
Liberian expatriate sportspeople in Croatia